The Aspendos International Opera and Ballet Festival (in Turkish: Aspendos Uluslararası Opera ve Bale Festivali) has been organized  in Aspendos, near Antalya, Turkey by the Turkish State Opera and Ballet directorate since 1994 with international participation by opera and ballet companies from several countries. The festival is held annually each June and July in the two-thousand-year-old Roman theatre. The theatre is noted as one of the best preserved antique theatres in the world, with many original features of the building remaining intact.

Past performances
As an example, in 2006, a wide variety of productions were presented by companies such as the Ankara State Opera and Ballet (a popular opera such as Aida) and the Mersin State Opera and Ballet with La Bayadère by Léon Minkus, Carmen (Georges Bizet), and Carmina Burana by (Carl Orff).
Other companies included the Ballett Zürich, the İzmir State Opera and Ballet (which presented Jivago/Zhivago by Alexander Borodin), and the Deutsche Oper Berlin with The Magic Flute

See also
List of opera festivals
Canadian Ballet Festival
International Ballet Festival of Havana
USA International Ballet Competition

External links
 Official website of the 2006 festival
 Official website of the 2009 festival
 Official site of the Turkish State Opera and Ballet

Opera festivals
Music festivals in Turkey
Opera in Turkey
Festivals in Antalya
1994 establishments in Turkey
Ballet competitions
Music festivals established in 1994
Summer events in Turkey